Copper Center (Tl’aticae’e in Ahtna) is a census-designated place (CDP) on the Copper River in Copper River Census Area, Alaska, United States. It is two hundred kilometers northeast of Anchorage. At the 2020 census the population was 338, up from 328 in 2000.

Geography
Copper Center has a dry-summer subarctic climate (Köppen climate classification: Dsc).

Copper Center is located at  (61.965305, -145.318280).

Copper Center is located on the Richardson Highway 4 south on the west bank of the Copper River at the confluence with the Klutina River. It is about 16 miles southeast of Glennallen on the Glenn Highway 1 and about 100 miles north of Valdez.

|Jan rain inch = 0.69	
|Feb rain inch = 0.57	
|Mar rain inch = 0.46	
|Apr rain inch = 0.19	
|May rain inch = 0.63	
|Jun rain inch = 1.68	
|Jul rain inch = 2	
|Aug rain inch = 1.45	
|Sep rain inch = 0.89	
|Oct rain inch = 0.89	
|Nov rain inch = 1.34	
|Dec rain inch = 1.61

|Jan snow inch = 9.9	
|Feb snow inch = 3.8	
|Mar snow inch = 4.2	
|Apr snow inch = 1	
|May snow inch = 0	
|Jun snow inch = 0	
|Jul snow inch = 0	
|Aug snow inch = 0	
|Sep snow inch = 0	
|Oct snow inch = 2.6	
|Nov snow inch = 10	
|Dec snow inch = 8

|Jan record high F = 45	
|Feb record high F = 48	
|Mar record high F = 58	
|Apr record high F = 70	
|May record high F = 78	
|Jun record high F = 92	
|Jul record high F = 89	
|Aug record high F = 94	
|Sep record high F = 84	
|Oct record high F = 60	
|Nov record high F = 49	
|Dec record high F = 44

|Jan record low F = -60	
|Feb record low F = -57	
|Mar record low F = -43	
|Apr record low F = -30	
|May record low F = 12	
|Jun record low F = 24	
|Jul record low F = 32	
|Aug record low F = 21	
|Sep record low F = 6	
|Oct record low F = -23	
|Nov record low F = -32	
|Dec record low F = -57

|Jan precipitation days = 3	
|Feb precipitation days = 2	
|Mar precipitation days = 3	
|Apr precipitation days = 1	
|May precipitation days = 4	
|Jun precipitation days = 7	
|Jul precipitation days = 9	
|Aug precipitation days = 6	
|Sep precipitation days = 5	
|Oct precipitation days = 5	
|Nov precipitation days = 5	
|Dec precipitation days = 5

|source 1 = WRCC
}}

History
Copper Center developed where the Valdez Glacier trail reached the Copper River.  Andrew Holman was its first resident, establishing a temporary roadhouse near the site in July 1898 to provide shelter for prospectors on their way to the Klondike.  He initially erected two tents: one served as Hotel Holman and the other as a makeshift post office.  By winter 1899, Holman had replaced his tents with a substantial cabin.  Leaving Dick Worthman to run the roadhouse, Holman pioneered the first mail route from Valdez to Eagle.

During the height of the Klondike stampede prospectors set up tent camps along both the Copper and Klutina rivers, but the first cabins were built on a site one half mile west of the Copper.  Another camp sprang up at what was called Copper Ferry, where a ferry crossed the river.  The area got a boost as a goldfield service center in June 1898, when B. F. Millard brushed a trail from there to the mouth of the Slana River via the foothills of Mt. Drum.

The east bank site of Old Copper Center apparently was settled in 1901 1902 by prospectors intent on investigating mineral prospects on that side of the river.  Its days as a mining center were short lived, but it did draw a Native population and existed for many years as a village.
  
Copper Center rapidly became the primary supply center for prospectors and travelers in the Copper River basin.  A telegraph station and the trail's first official post office opened in 1901, with Ringwald Blix serving as the community's first postmaster.  The next year, John McCrary staked a homestead about a mile north of the Klutina River crossing.  Before long, McCrary opened a hotel as well, the first frame roadhouse between Valdez and Fairbanks.  Much of McCrary's property remains in the family's hands.

By 1910 American settlers had established over fifty homesteads in the vicinity.  The community now received tri-weekly mail delivery in the winter and weekly service in the summer.  It also contained the only telegraph station between Valdez and Fairbanks where money could be sent or received by wire.

Florence "Ma" Barnes acquired Hotel Holman in 1922, and renamed it the Copper Center Roadhouse and Trading Post.  The original building burned in 1932 and was replaced by the southernmost portion of the current one.  When Barnes died in 1948, she left her entire estate to a Valdez orphanage.  Later that year, it sold George Ashby the property.  Although Ashby died in 1979, his family continued to operate the roadhouse.  The replacement roadhouse itself burned on May 20, 2012.  The family says they intend to rebuild.

Demographics

Copper Center first appeared on the 1910 U.S. Census as an unincorporated village. In 1980 it was made a census-designated place (CDP).

As of the census of 2000, there were 362 people, 132 households, and 88 families residing in the CDP. There were 163 housing units at an average density of 11.9/sq mi (4.6/km2). The racial makeup of the CDP was 48.07% White, 0.28% Black or African American, 46.69% Native American, and 4.97% from two or more races.  0.83% of the population were Hispanic or Latino of any race.

Of the 132 households, 40.2% had children under the age of 18 living with them, 37.1% were married couples living together, 19.7% had a female householder with no husband present, and 33.3% were non-families. 28.8% of all households were made up of individuals, and 7.6% had someone living alone who was 65 years of age or older.  The average household size was 2.74 and the average family size was 3.39.

In the CDP, the population was spread out, with 38.7% under the age of 18, 7.2% from 18 to 24, 22.7% from 25 to 44, 23.2% from 45 to 64, and 8.3% who were 65 years of age or older.  The median age was 31 years. For every 100 females, there were 106.9 males.  For every 100 females age 18 and over, there were 109.4 males.

The median income for a household in the CDP was $32,188, and the median income for a family was $42,500. Males had a median income of $46,250 versus $22,083 for females. The per capita income for the CDP was $15,152.  About 18.5% of families and 18.8% of the population were below the poverty line, including 23.1% of those under age 18 and 6.9% of those age 65 or over.

Education
Public education in the area is provided by Kenny Lake School of the Copper River School District.

References

Ahtna
Census-designated places in Alaska
Census-designated places in Copper River Census Area, Alaska
Census-designated places in Unorganized Borough, Alaska
Mining communities in Alaska